Ytterbium(III) sulfate (ytterbium sulphate) is a ytterbium salt of sulfuric acid, with formula Yb2(SO4)3.  It is used mostly for research. This compound's solubility decreases with increasing temperature.

References

External links 
 Ytterbium Sulfate American Elements

Ytterbium compounds
Sulfates